Frederick Loomis may refer to:
 Frederick Oscar Warren Loomis (1870–1937), Canadian soldier
 Frederic Brewster Loomis (1873–1937), American paleontologist